Kol Yisrael or Kol Israel ( lit. "Voice of Israel", also "Israel Radio") is Israel's public domestic and international radio service. It operated as a division of the Israel Broadcasting Service from 1951 to 1965, the Israel Broadcasting Authority from 1965 to 2017, and is currently administered by the Israeli Broadcasting Corporation.

History
Kol Yisrael was originally an underground Haganah radio station that broadcast from Tel Aviv. It started consistently broadcasting in December 1947 under the name Telem-Shamir-Boaz, and was renamed to Kol HaHagana ("Voice of the Haganah") in March 1948. With Israel's declaration of independence on May 14, 1948, it was transformed into the official station Kol Yisrael. Another station named Kol Yisrael operated in Haifa, and was renamed Kol Tzva HaHagana ("Voice of the Defense Force").

The first Kol Yisrael transmission was a live broadcast from Tel Aviv of David Ben-Gurion reading of the declaration of independence. It was operated by a department of the Ministry of the Interior responsible for domestic and international broadcasts. Responsibility for the service was later transferred to the Office of Posts and Telegraphs and then to the Prime Minister's Office.

The station inherited the facilities of the former Palestine Broadcasting Service, which had been founded as the official broadcaster of the Mandate of Palestine in 1936, and had run the Kol Yerushalayim radio station. Kol Yisrael staff was made up of both former PBS personnel and former staffers at the Haganah underground radio stations.

Kol Yisrael pioneered the use of FM transmission. In the early years, stations were operated in Jerusalem, Tel Aviv, and Haifa. The PBS had had its transmitter in Ramallah, but this transmitter was lost to Kol Yisrael due to Ramallah being in the Arab sector.

In March 1950, international broadcasting began under the name Kol Zion La Golah ("The Voice of Zion to the Diaspora.") The broadcasts were produced at Kol Yisrael by the World Zionist Organization in cooperation with the Jewish Agency, and aimed to foster communication between the Israeli state and the Jewish diaspora. The service broadcast readings from the Torah alongside documentary programs on life in Israel. In 1958, the international service was merged with the domestic broadcaster, with both services operating under the Kol Yisrael name.

Between 1958 and 1965, the "Kol Yisrael" international services expanded rapidly, inaugurating new shortwave services in Afrikaans, English, French, Hungarian, Italian, Persian, Romanian, and Yiddish. Between 1960 and 1963, the service also broadcast daily programs in English, French and Swahili for African audiences and began distributing tapes for rebroadcasting across the continent. This appeal to international audiences was closely tied to Israel's Periphery doctrine, which sought to align Israel with states on the fringes of the Middle East to avoid 'encirclement' by the Arab states and counteract international support for Palestinian nationalism. Programs on the international services ranged from news and commentary programs to competitions, documentaries and readings from the Bible and Quran. However, the technical quality of the international services was often poor beyond Israel's immediate neighbors in the Middle East.

In 1965, the Israel Broadcasting Authority, an independent public entity, was created and took over responsibility for Kol Yisrael from the Prime Minister's Office. In 1973, the IBA adopted the name Shidurei Yisrael ("Israel Broadcasting") for the service's domestic radio and television services. The name Kol Yisrael was revived for the domestic and international radio service in 1979.

Kol Yisrael'''s shortwave services have gradually been discontinued over time. The last remaining shortwave service, the Persian programme for Iran, ceased transmissions on June 30 2013. However, Israel continues to broadcast international services in fourteen languages under the label of Israel Radio International.

Name: meaning and significance
A previous station named Kol Yisrael had briefly been operated by the Haganah in 1940 on the 42-meter band. However, the station was soon renamed when the Haganah decided that the Kol Yisrael name should be reserved until independence.

Besides meaning "voice of Israel", Kol Yisrael is also a wordplay which in Hebrew sounds like the phrase "all of Israel" (although spelled differently), known to many Jews as part of the Talmudic expression "כל ישראל ערבים זה בזה" (kol Yisra'el arevim ze ba'ze, roughly translated "all of Israel are responsible for one another").

An internet radio station was launched in 2014 and operated through 2015 under the name of "Voice of Israel". This station is not connected to the official Kol Yisrael run by Israel Radio International.

Broadcast channels

Current Kol Yisrael channels include:Kan Tarbut ("The Culture Network"), also referred to as Kol Yisrael – General talk and cultural programming.Kan Bet ("Network B") – Popular radio station with news and current affairs programming, as well as sports coverage. There are news bulletins on the hour in Hebrew.Kan Gimel ("Network C") – Radio station devoted for promoting Israeli music. There are news bulletins in Hebrew at the same times as Kan Bet.Makan ("Network D") – Arabic-language radio station also known as Sawt Isra'eel (in Arabic صوت إسرائيل meaning "Voice of Israel" in Arabic)Kan REKA (Acronym of REshet Klitat Aliya" - lit. "Immigrant absorption network") – Radio for olim (immigrants) to Israel. Broadcasts in 14 languages, including English at 0430, 1030, 1830 UTC (+1 hr during the Summer).
Israel Radio International – International broadcasts in 14 languages: English, French, Persian, Bukhori, Yiddish, Spanish, Maghrebi Arabic, Georgian, Amharic, Tigrinya, Ladino, Hungarian, Romanian, and Russian. The international services are currently only available via online streaming and rebroadcasts through the domestic REKA network.Kan 88 – "High Quality" music (their terminology). Jazz, blues, electronic music and more, plus traffic newsKan Kol Ha Musica ("The Voice of Music") – Classical music and drama.Kan Moreshet ("The Heritage Network") – Religious broadcasting on Kan Tarbut's network.

There are also educational stations broadcasting via low-power transmitters from colleges and universities across Israel under the collective banner of Tachana Chinuchit.

All of Kol Israels stations are available worldwide through streaming audio over the Internet. Live broadcasts as well as archived programs are available to listeners.

Gallery

See also
IBA News
Israel Broadcasting Authority
Israel Radio International, the official radio service for immigrants and for listeners outside IsraelKol Yerushalayim, the Hebrew program of Jerusalem Calling, the radio station of the British Mandatory Authority
Media of Israel

References

Further reading
Mann, Izi (2008). This is the Voice of Israel broadcasting from Jerusalem...: A Nation Behind the Microphone''. Israel Broadcasting Authority. (in Hebrew)

External links

Official site 
Frequencies to receive Kol Israel networks

Publicly funded broadcasters
Radio networks
Radio stations in Israel
International broadcasters
Radio stations established in 1947
1947 establishments in Mandatory Palestine
Israel Broadcasting Authority